Southworth Creek is a stream, about  long, in Lincoln County, in the U.S. state of Oregon. It is a tributary of the Alsea River, which it enters upstream of Waldport and the Pacific Ocean.

Southworth Creek was named for Lewis Southworth, a former slave who settled there in the 1880s. It was originally called Darkey Creek until the Oregon Geographic Names Board was asked to officially change the name.

See also
 List of rivers of Oregon

References

Rivers of Oregon
Alsea River
Rivers of Lincoln County, Oregon